Anamorsin is a protein that in humans is encoded by the CIAPIN1 gene.

CIAPIN1 is a cytokine-induced inhibitor of apoptosis with no relation to apoptosis regulatory molecules of the BCL2 (MIM 151430) or CASP (see MIM 147678) families. Expression of CIAPIN1 is dependent on growth factor stimulation (Shibayama et al., 2004).[supplied by OMIM]

References

External links

Further reading